Kuronezumia is a genus of rattails.

Species
There are currently six recognized species in this genus:
 Kuronezumia bubonis (Iwamoto, 1974) (Bulbous rattail)
 Kuronezumia darus (C. H. Gilbert & C. L. Hubbs, 1916)
 Kuronezumia leonis (Barnard, 1925) (Snubnose whiptail)
 Kuronezumia macronema (H. M. Smith & Radcliffe, 1912)
 Kuronezumia paepkei Shcherbachev, Sazonov & Iwamoto, 1992
 Kuronezumia pallida Sazonov & Iwamoto, 1992 (Pallid whiptail)

References

Macrouridae